Moonface may refer to:

 The iconographic tradition of depicting the Moon with a face, see Moon in culture
 Moon face, a medical sign where the face swells up into a rounded shape
 "Moon-Face", a short story by Jack London
Moonface, a fictional character in Enid Blyton's The Magic Faraway Tree series
Saint Walker's nickname by Kilowog in Green Lantern: The Animated Series
Bert Newton, Australian television presenter
Jason Cundy, English former association football player and Radio and Television presenter
Moonface Martin, a fictional gangster in Cole Porter's 1934 hit musical Anything Goes and the title character of a short spinoff 2008 independent film, Moonface
Moonface, a music project by Canadian musician Spencer Krug
Moonface (fr. Face de Lune), a 1992 graphic novel by Alejandro Jodorowsky and François Boucq
Moonface (podcast), 2019 fiction podcast

See also
Man in the Moon (disambiguation)